Brother Ray can refer to either one of the following:

Bubba Ray Dudley, American professional wrestling|professional wrestler
Ray Charles, American R&B and soul musician